Joe Rickard Persson (born 1959) is a Swedish politician and former member of the Riksdag, the national legislature. A member of the Green Party, he represented Skåne County West between September 2014 and September 2018.

Persson is the son of editorial manager Folke Persson and shop assistant Ingegerd Persson (née Olsson). He was educated in Ystad. He studied personnel administration at Lund University and project management at IHM Business School. He was a shipping manager (1980-1984); political ombudsman (1988-1995); business advisor (1995-2002); and an administrator at the Swedish Social Insurance Agency (2002-2014). He was a member of the municipal council in Helsingborg Municipality between 1985 and 2014.

References

1959 births
Living people
Members of the Riksdag 2014–2018
Members of the Riksdag from the Green Party